Alfredo Martín can refer to:

 Alfredo Martín (footballer)
 Alfredo Martín (rower)